Jean-Yves Malmasson (born 1963) is a French composer and conductor.

Malmasson was born in Saint-Cloud in the Paris suburbs. After studies in piano, ondes Martenot, and composition at  the Conservatoire National de Région, Boulogne-Billancourt, he went on to study composition and conducting at the Conservatoire de Paris, where he won a first prize in composition. His orchestral tone poem "Le chant de Dahut" for ondes Martenot and Orchestra won the SACEM prize at the 1988 Festival des tombées de la nuit, in Rennes (France).

His principal teachers include Alain Louvier, Pierre Grouvel, Serge Nigg, Jacques Charpentier (musical writing technique and composition), and  Jean-Claude Hartemann and Jean-Sébastien Bereau (conducting).

Malmasson's compositions are written in an expressive, extended-tonal style which uses a great deal of  harmonic vocabulary borrowed from the style of Olivier Messiaen (notably in the early work "Un feu ardent dans un silence noir et froid" for pianoforte).  Malmasson is often inspired by space and astronomy ("Mare Nostrum" for Orchestra, "Coro).

In addition to being the musical director of the city of Puteaux wind orchestra, a post he has held since 1988, Jean-Yves Malmasson is also director of Orchestre Philharmonique des Yvelines et de l'Ouest Francilien (Versailles).

 Works 
 Op. 1: Prelude (1978) for orchestra
 Op. 2: Un feu ardent dans un silence noir et froid (1980) for pianoforte
 Op. 3: Variations sur "b.a.c.h."  (1981) for pianoforte
 Op. 4: Symphonie n° 1 "dsch", hommage à Dmitri Shostakovich (1981–83, rév. 2000) for orchestra
 Op. 5: Invocation a la lune (1983) for two ondes martenots, piano and percussion
 Op. 6: Trois melodies sur des poemes de Charles Baudelaire (1984) for medium voice and piano
 Op. 6b: Trois melodies sur des poemes de Charles Baudelaire (1984, arrg. 2001) for medium voice, violoncello and piano
 Op. 7: Le chant de Dahut (1985) orchestral tone poen for ondes martenot and orchestra
 Op. 8: Trois miniatures burlesques (1988) for string quartet
 Op.8a: Trois miniatures burlesques (1995) for string orchestra
 Op. 9: Quatuor a cordes (1988–91) for string quartet
 Op. 10: La lettre à Eloïse (1991) humoristic piece for violin, piano and triangle
 Op. 11: Estebaña (1991) for violin, piano and "accessoires pittoresques"
 Op. 12: Diptyque (1992) passacaille and scherzo on a theme by a. berg, for violoncello and piano
 Op. 13: Metapastiches (1992–93) for orchestra
 Op. 14: Concerto grosso (1992–94) for ondes martenot, keyboard percussion quartet and concert band
 Op. 15: Hymne aux lumieres (1994) for concert band
 Op. 16: Amuse-gueule (1994) for concert band
 Op. 17: Trois poemes de Paul Eluard (1996) for baritone and quartet(clar., cor, vl., vlc.)
 Op. 18: Figurines' (1996) for brass quintet.
 Op. 19: Mare nostrum (1996) passacaille pour orchestre.
 Op. 20: 3 pieces for flute and piano (teaching piece)(1997)
 Op. 21: 3 pieces for piano (teaching piece)(1997)
 Op. 22: Sonatine entomologique for flute, oboe, clarinet, bassoon and percussion (1997)
 Op. 23: Corona borealis (1997) for large orchestra
 Op. 24: Burlesques (1998) suite for string orchestra.
 Op. 25: Trois poemes de Charles Baudelaire (1999) for voice and orchestra.
 Op. 26: Quatre miniatures burlesques (1999) for piano 4 hands
 Op. 27: Symphonie n° 2, for string orchestra (2000)
 Op. 28: Memoire du futur, ou cantate pour la paix (2000- ) cantata for soloists, chorus and orchestra on a text by Hervé Miclos act 1 has been completed to date.
 Op. 29: 5 aphorismes in memoriam D. D. Chostakovitch', trio n° 1 for violin, violoncello and piano (2001)
 Op. 30: Les fleurs du desir (2001) chamber cantata for soprano voice with violin, violoncello and piano
 Op. 31: Sinfonietta (2002) for string orchestra, piano and percussion
 Op. 32: Sketches a quatre (2002) three easy pieces for string quartet
 Op. 33: Aux bien brulants astres d'or (1995–2002) Symphony n° 3 for chorus and orchestra
 Op. 34a: Album pour Odile (2003) 3 easy pieces for clarinet and piano
 Op. 34b: Duos pour Odile (2003) 2 easy pieces for two clarinets and piano
 Op.34c: Album pour Odile (2003, transcription 2005) 3 easy pieces for alto saxophone and  piano
 Op.34d: Duos pour Odile (2003, transcription 2005) 2 easy pieces for  2 alto saxophones piano
 Op. 35: De soleil et de vent (2004) for ondes martenot solo
 Op. 36: Les exilés, trio n° 2 for violin, violoncello and piano (2004–2005), with an actor ad libitum
 Op. 37: Trois figurines (2005) récitatif, choral et fugue for organ
 Op. 38: Tonton claudio (2006) musical tale for narrator and 14 instruments, to present the instruments to children
 Op. 39: Croquis asymetriques (2006) a booklet of 9 violin duets
 Op. 40: Cantilene pour francois (2006) for solo cello
 Op. 41: Fantaisie sur Les brigands d'Offenbach (2007) for clarinet quartet or band
 Op. 41b: Fantaisie sur Les brigands d'Offenbach (2007, arr. 2008) for saxophone quartet or band
 Op. 42: Mouvement symphonique (2007) for orchestra
 Op. 43: Frontispice'' (2008) for orchestra

External links 
 The Composer's Personal Website

Concert band composers
French classical composers
French male classical composers
20th-century classical composers
21st-century classical composers
French male conductors (music)
1963 births
Living people
People from Saint-Cloud
20th-century French composers
21st-century French composers
20th-century French conductors (music)
21st-century French conductors (music)
20th-century French male musicians
21st-century French male musicians